James Neal Thomason (March 28, 1920 – August 4, 2007) was an American football halfback. The Brownwood, Texas native was part of the 1939 national championship team of Texas A&M University. He was selected 5th overall by the Detroit Lions in the 1941 NFL Draft.

External links 
 Obituary
 

1920 births
2007 deaths
American football halfbacks
Texas A&M Aggies football players
Detroit Lions players
People from Brownwood, Texas
United States Army Air Forces personnel of World War II
United States Army Air Forces officers
Military personnel from Texas